Arosh Janoda (born 11 September 1987) is a Sri Lankan cricketer. He made his first-class debut for Colts Cricket Club in the 2007–08 Premier Trophy on 27 March 2008.

See also
 List of Chilaw Marians Cricket Club players

References

External links
 

1987 births
Living people
Sri Lankan cricketers
Chilaw Marians Cricket Club cricketers
Colts Cricket Club cricketers
Saracens Sports Club cricketers
Cricketers from Colombo